The 1969 New Zealand bravery awards were announced via two Special Honours Lists dated 21 April and 17 September 1969, and recognised two people for acts of bravery in 1968 and 1969.

George Medal (GM)
 Detective Inspector Edward Graham Perry – New Zealand Police; of Auckland.

British Empire Medal (BEM)
Civil division, for gallantry
 Brian David Clark – 15 years of ago; of Ngaio.

References

Bravery
Bravery awards
New Zealand bravery awards